Baldacci is a surname. Notable people with the surname include:

 Antonio Baldacci (botanist) (1867–1950), Italian scholar, botanist, and geographer
 Antonio Baldacci (rower) (born 1951), Italian rower
 David Baldacci (born 1960), American novelist
 Joe Baldacci (born 1965), American attorney and Democratic politician
 John Baldacci (born 1955), American politician. 73rd Governor of the U.S. state of Maine (2003–2011)
 Giovanna Bruna Baldacci (1886–?), Italian musician and poet
 Giuseppe Baldacci (1856–?), Italian architect
 Lou Baldacci (born 1934), American football player
 Maria Maddalena Baldacci (1718–1782), Italian painter 
 Mirco Baldacci (born 1977), Sammarinese rally driver 
 Paul Baldacci (1907–1984), American football player

Other uses
Baldacci Family Vineyards, a California winery